Guhu-Samane, also known as Bia, Mid-Waria, Muri, Paiawa, Tahari, is a divergent Trans–New Guinea language that is related to the Binanderean family in the classification of Malcolm Ross (2005).

The divergence of Guhu-Samane from other Binanderean languages may be due to extensive historical contact with Oceanic languages such as Numbami.

Dialects
Smallhorn (2011:131) gives the following dialects.
Kipu (most widely spoken)
Bapi
Garaina
Sekare
Sinaba
The dialect differences are principally lexical, but two voiced obstruents also show regular variants. The coronal obstruent is realized as /dz/ upriver in Bapi and Garaina, /d/ downriver to Asama, and /j/ farther downriver in Papua. The voiced bilabial is realized as /b/ inland but as /w/ at the coast (Sinaba and Paiawa) (Handman 2015:102).

References

 Handman, Courtney. 2015. Critical Christianity: Translation and denominational conflict in Papua New Guinea. Oakland: University of California Press.

 Smallhorn, Jacinta Mary. 2011. The Binanderean languages of Papua New Guinea: reconstruction and subgrouping. Canberra: Pacific Linguistics.

Further reading
 

Greater Binanderean languages
Languages of Papua New Guinea